Marybank (IPA:[ˈpɾuəxˈmaːɾʲɪ]) is a settlement on the outskirts of Stornoway, Isle of Lewis in the Outer Hebrides of Scotland. It is also  within the parish of Stornoway. Marybank is situated at the junction of the A858 and A859. Lews Castle and Stornoway Golf Club are to the east of Marybank.

References

External links

Canmore - Lewis, Marybank, Marybank Quarry site record
Canmore - Lewis, Stornoway, Lews Castle, Marybank Lodge site record

Villages in the Isle of Lewis